Hanumanpur is a village in Amreli district, Gujarat, India.

Villages in Amreli district